The Cup of Peace and Friendship (also Friendship of Socialist Countries Cup) was the auto racing championship series dedicated to Eastern Bloc drivers between 1963 and 1990.

History 
The series was created in 1963 on the initiative of Lech Tulak and Jerzy Jankowski from Polish Automobile and Motorcycle Federation. The main idea of the cup was unification of auto racing in Eastern Bloc countries so there was also classification of national teams. Initially the championship was held only in the category of single seaters. Heinz Melkus and East Germany were the first champions. Until 1964 championships were held according to the rules of Formula Junior, then Formula Three. Since 1972 cars had to meet the requirements of Formula Easter. In 1973 the touring car championship was also introduced. After the revolutions of 1989 the Cup of Peace and Friendship lost its importance and was dissolved in 1990.

Champions

References 

1963 establishments in Europe
1990 disestablishments in Europe
Formula racing series
Touring car racing series
European auto racing series